The Zhdanivska coal mine is a large coal mine located in the south-east of Ukraine in Donetsk Oblast. With estimated reserves of 43.3 million tonnes, Zhdanivska represents one of the largest coal reserves in Ukraine. The annual coal production is around 712,000 tonnes.

See also 

 Coal in Ukraine
 List of mines in Ukraine

References 

Coal mines in Ukraine
Coal mines in the Soviet Union
Economy of Donetsk Oblast